LFF Stadium (Lithuanian Football Federation stadium), formerly known as Vėtra Stadium, is a football stadium in Vilnius, Lithuania. The stadium has a capacity of 5,067 people and was home of the Lithuanian national football team between 2012 and 2022.

Overview
The stadium was first named Lokomotyvas in Soviet era due to its location close to the Vilnius railway station.

In 2004 it was the first private football-oriented stadium in Lithuania rebuilt after the Soviet era. It was then renamed to Vėtra Stadium as the home ground of Vėtra. In 2005 it hosted its first national team matches.

Following the bankruptcy of Vėtra in 2010, the stadium was taken over by the Lithuanian Football Federation and renamed again as the LFF Stadium. The stadium has undergone various improvements to meet UEFA 3rd category stadium status. Following the renovation, the stadium also includes the new headquarters of the LFF, while the grass pitch was changed to an artificial turf.

In 2015 the stadium was renewed - the artificial turf was renewed with a new higher quality surface, and the stadium lighting system was updated. A year later, before the match with Malta, a new scoreboard was installed. Pitch was once again replaced in April 2020.

Since 2012, the stadium is the home of the Lithuanian national football team and one of the top Lithuanian clubs Žalgiris Vilnius. It also sometimes hosts local American football team Iron Wolves of the Baltic American Football League, and it's also the venue of the Dancing Day of the Lithuanian Song Festival.

The current capacity of the stadium is 5,067.

References

External links

Football venues in Lithuania
Sports venues in Vilnius
Multi-purpose stadiums in Lithuania
Sports venues completed in 2004
2004 establishments in Lithuania
FK Žalgiris